Giovanni Francesco da Rimini (1420–1469), was an Italian painter. The artist was previously only known as the Master of the Scenes from the Life of the Virgin, until the works were properly attributed.

Life
He was born in Rimini, and documents have him in Padua between 1441 and 1444, and several times in Bologna between 1459 and 1469. He painted primarily religious works for church commissions. His style and depictions of depth in some of his works infer that he may have been influenced by the sculptures of Agostino di Duccio. Corrado Ricci saw in his style the influence of Bonfigli, and attributed to him paintings in the apse of the Duomo of Atri. He died in Bologna in 1469. Ricci sets the year of death as 1471.

References

 Charles R. Mack, European Art in the Columbia Museum of Art, Including the Samuel H. Kress Collection, Volume I: the Thirteenth though the Sixteenth Century, Columbia: University of South Carolina Press, 2009, 74–77.

External links

1420 births
1469 deaths
15th-century Italian painters
Italian male painters
People from Rimini